Ser o no ser is a Spanish teen drama television series created by Coral Cruz for RTVE Play (Playz) which premiered on 30 March 2022. The cast is led by Ander Puig.

Plot 
The plot follows the story  of 16-year-old trans student Joel, who joins a new high school in order to pursue the title of Baccalaureate with specialization in performing arts. Choosing to not disclose his gender transition to his new classmates, he struggles with the requirements from his acting teacher. Meanwhile, he develops a crush on classmate Ona.

Cast

Production 
Created and written by Coral Cruz, the series was produced by RTVE in collaboration with Big Bang Media (The Mediapro Studio). Directed by Marta Pahissa, it consists of 6 episodes featuring a running time of around 25 minutes. The series began filming in Barcelona by October 2021.

Release 
RTVE Play released the series on 30 March 2022.

Accolades 

|-
| align = "center" | 2023 || 34th GLAAD Media Awards || colspan = "2" | Outstanding Spanish-Language Scripted Television Series ||  || align = "center" | 
|}

References

External links 
 Ser o no ser on RTVE Play

RTVE Play original programming
2022 Spanish television series debuts
2020s Spanish drama television series
2020s LGBT-related television series
Spanish teen drama television series
Spanish LGBT-related television shows
Transgender-related television shows
Television shows filmed in Spain
Spanish-language television shows
2020s LGBT-related drama television series